Meioherpia is a genus of pholidoskepian solenogasters, shell-less, worm-like, marinemollusks.

References

Pholidoskepia